Giovanni Battista Desio (1628–1677) was a Roman Catholic prelate who served as Bishop of Venosa (1674–1677).

Biography
Giovanni Battista Desio was born in Naples, Italy on 28 April 1628 and ordained a priest on 8 April 1651.

On 28 April 1628, he was appointed Bishop of Venosa by Pope Urban VIII. On 16 May 1674, he was consecrated bishop by Giulio Spinola, Bishop of Nepi e Sutri, with Giacomo de Angelis, formerly Archbishop of Urbino, and Pier Antonio Capobianco, formerly Bishop of Lacedonia, serving as co-consecrators.

He served as Bishop of Venosa until his death in August 1677.

References

External links and additional sources
 (for Chronology of Bishops) 
 (for Chronology of Bishops) 

17th-century Italian Roman Catholic bishops
Bishops appointed by Pope Urban VIII
1628 births
1677 deaths